Amanda Billings (born December 14, 1986) is a Canadian figure skater. She had been expected to contend for the 2006 Winter Olympics, but an injury on December 21, 2005, prevented her doing so.

She trained at the Calalta club in Calgary, with coaches Scott Davis and Sharon Lariviere. She is an alumna of Bishop Carroll High School, which is designed for students needing a flexible schedule, and includes a number of other top Canadian athletes.

In 2007, Billings took on the role of Gabriella in the east coast version of Disney's High School Musical: The Ice Tour.

Competitive highlights

References

External links 
Official Site
Profile of Amanda Billings by Skate Canada; URL last accessed February 18, 2006
Moore, Jacque, "Why Amanda Can't Skate", Swerve: Calgary Inside & Out (supplement to the Calgary Herald), March 17, 2006. pp. 18–25.
Disney puts a new spin on 'High School Musical', The Tennessean; URL last accessed September 17, 2007
 

1986 births
Living people
Figure skaters from Calgary
Canadian female single skaters
Canadian people of British descent